The Eastern Regional Organisation for Planning and Housing (EAROPH) is a non-governmental multi-sectorial organisation encompassing the private,
public and academic sectors.  The organization was established to foster the exchange of insights and experiences among countries in the EAROPH region, which has been acknowledged as the most dynamic in the world in terms of economic growth, magnitude of urbanization, population size and ethnic diversity. The EAROPH region covers all countries in Asia, Australasia and the Pacific region.

EAROPH promotes a better understanding of Human Settlements and encourages excellence in planning, development and management to improve the quality of life and sustainability of human settlements.

History
EAROPH was founded at a Congress in New Delhi, India, in 1954. The formation of EAROPH was a response to a movement among emerging third world nations to recognise and protect their socio/cultural identities and traditional values in the face of rapid urbanization. Urban planning and the provision of housing for the masses were of particular interest to the new organization, which sought solutions grounded in local understanding by those “culturally in-tune” with the countries involved.

EAROPH was officially inaugurated under its new constitution at the second EAROPH International Congress in Tokyo, Japan in 1960 and gained its NGO status from the United Nations (UN) through its then parent organization, the International Federation for Housing and Planning (IFHP). The EAROPH Secretariat was moved from New Delhi, India to Kuala Lumpur, Malaysia, in 1978.

Goals
The goals of EAROPH are;
 to consolidate and promote expertise in Human Settlements in the EAROPH Region.
 To provide a forum for continuous collaboration between governments, private sectors and people in addressing Human Settlements issues.
 To promote personal professional development of its members.
 To provide expert technical support for members.
 To provide expert technical consultancy services on a commercial basis.
 To facilitate the exchange of information, experiences, ideas and insights among members.
 To foster links with organisations with similar interests in other regions.

Activities
Activities and projects carried out by EAROPH include and have included the following:
 Arranging technical exchange programmes between countries;
 Organising international conferences and regional seminars;
 Running short-term technical training programmes;
 Conducting technical field visits to member countries;
 Promoting joint-venture urban development projects;
 Facilitating funding arrangements for project between donor agencies and beneficiary countries in the EAROPH region;
 Hosting public forums for key policy makers to highlight current issues, publishing bulletins and journals.

References

Earoph Australia Chapter

Professional planning institutes